The Green Mountain Railroad  is a class III railroad operating in Vermont. GMRC operates on tracks that had been owned by the Rutland Railroad and Boston and Maine Railroad. The railroad operates on a rail line between North Walpole, New Hampshire, and Rutland, Vermont. GMRC's corporate colors are green and yellow.

Once owned by F. Nelson Blount, the founder of Steamtown, USA, GMRC controlled the tracks that were used for Steamtown's excursions between Riverside Station in Bellows Falls and Chester, Vermont. After Blount's death in 1967, GMRC changed hands, and a bitter relationship between the two organizations developed.

History
The Green Mountain Railroad was formed in early 1964 when F. Nelson Blount, who also operated a museum of steam locomotives, called Steamtown, USA, in North Walpole, New Hampshire. Blount convinced the State of Vermont to acquire  of track between Bellows Falls and Rutland, which he would operate as the Green Mountain Railroad. Also in 1964, incorporation papers were filed for the "Steamtown Foundation for the Preservation of Steam and Railroad Americana".  The first order of business for the non-profit charitable and educational organization was to acquire the Blount collection at North Walpole and relocate it to property once owned by the Rutland Railroad in Bellows Falls.

In 1966, the GMRC obtained trackage rights over Boston and Maine track between Bellows Falls, Vermont and North Walpole, New Hampshire: just across the Connecticut River, allowing the GMRC access to servicing and storage facilities for locomotives, which had previously been lacking. Blount was killed when his private airplane hit a tree during an emergency landing in Marlborough, New Hampshire on August 31, 1967, flying back to his home.  He had held the controlling interest in the GMRC, owning 746 of the 750 shares of the company.  In 1968, in response to Blount's death, 49% of the railroad's shares were sold to private investors, with the remainder being held by Robert Adams, president of the railroad from 1968 until 1978. By 1976, the relationship between Steamtown and GMRC was strained as the two organizations fought over maintenance of the tracks, which were owned by the state of Vermont. Steamtown relocated to Scranton, Pennsylvania in 1983, and, shortly afterward, GMRC began offering its own passenger excursions with diesel-powered trains over the same stretch of track.

During the 1980s, the GMRC struggled to maintain consistent profits, relying largely on on-line traffic.  Despite a position as a bridge carrier between the Delaware and Hudson Railroad and the Clarendon and Pittsford Railway at Rutland, and the Boston and Maine at North Walpole, this traffic was limited, as the Boston and Maine was consistently unfriendly toward the Green Mountain.  Reflecting this uncomfortable position, the GMRC's traffic during the 1980s was generally less than 2000 cars moved per year.  In 1986, a strike at the Delaware & Hudson led to the evaporation of what little overhead traffic the railroad was handling.  During the early 1990s, however, overhead traffic like limestone and fly ash had increased, making up for a decrease in traditional on-line traffic like talc. By the mid 1990s, traffic had increased to upwards of 4,000 annual carloads, and has increased today to upward of 5,000 annual carloads. When the New England Central Railroad commenced operations in 1995, this allowed the GMRC to offer service southward on the NECR, which had previously been prohibitively-expensive when the route was owned by the Central Vermont Railroad. In 1997, the GMRC was acquired by the Vermont Railway, forming the basis for the Vermont Rail System, which would grow  to include five railroads in Vermont and one in New York.

Locomotive fleet
As of July 2021, the GMRC's fleet consisted of the following:

Former units of the Green Mountain Railroad fleet

These units are no longer in service on the Green Mountain Railroad. They have either been sold to other railroads or have been scrapped for parts.

References

External links

Rutland Railway Association

New Hampshire railroads
Vermont railroads
New York (state) railroads
Spin-offs of the Rutland Railroad
Railway companies established in 1964
Transportation in Rutland County, Vermont
Transportation in Windham County, Vermont
Transportation in Windsor County, Vermont
Transportation in Cheshire County, New Hampshire
Heritage railroads in Vermont
Heritage railroads in New Hampshire